The 1993 Four Corners hantavirus outbreak was an outbreak of hantavirus that caused the first known human cases of hantavirus disease in the United States. It occurred within the Four Corners region – the geographic intersection of the U.S. states of Utah, Colorado, New Mexico, and Arizona –  of the Southwestern United States in mid-1993. This region is largely occupied by Native American tribal lands, including the Hopi, Ute, Zuni, and Navajo reservations, from which many of the cases were reported.

The virus killed 13 people — half of those it infected, for a mortality rate of 50%.

The cause of the outbreak was found to be a previously unknown species of hantavirus, which was responsible for a new form of illness known as hantavirus pulmonary syndrome or HPS. The virus is carried by deer mice. Originally referred to as "Four Corners virus", "Muerto Canyon virus", and "Convict Creek virus", it was later named Sin Nombre virus. Transmission to humans was found to have occurred through contact with aerosolized deer mice droppings in enclosed spaces in and around the homes of the victims.

Background 

In April 1993, a young Navajo woman arrived at the Indian Medical Center emergency room in Gallup, New Mexico, complaining of flu-like symptoms and sudden, severe shortness of breath. Doctors found the woman's lungs to be full of fluid, and she died soon after her arrival. An autopsy revealed the woman's lungs to be twice the normal weight for someone her age. The cause of her death could not be immediately determined, and the case was reported to the New Mexico Department of Health.

Five days later, her fiancé, a young Navajo man, was en route to her funeral in Gallup when he suddenly became severely short of breath. By the time paramedics brought him to the Indian Medical Center emergency room, he had stopped breathing and the paramedics were performing cardiopulmonary resuscitation. The young man could not be revived by doctors and died. The physicians, recalling the similar symptoms and death of the young woman, reported his death to the New Mexico Department of Health.

New Mexico state health officials notified the Centers for Disease Control (CDC). Within a week, a task force had formed in Albuquerque that included Bruce Tempest, chief of medicine at the Indian Medical Center. Tempest quickly discovered that five people, including the young man's fiancée, as well as an Arizona resident, all had experienced the same symptoms and all had died within a six-month period. Tempest learned from the young man's family members that his fiancée had the same symptoms and died on the Navajo Reservation five days earlier. Deaths on the reservations are not reported to the state health department because they are sovereign nations. Tempest had considered plague as the cause because it is endemic to the region, but it had already been ruled out by tests on all of the victims. Within a short time, a dozen more people contracted the mysterious illness, most of them young Navajos in New Mexico. This included two relatives of the young couple who had died within a week of each other.

Discovery of Sin Nombre virus

News outlets began reporting on the story of a mystery illness causing deaths among young Navajo, often using the term "Navajo Flu". Hearing a news report, a physician notified health officials to say that the illness had similarities to hantavirus, which he had observed in Korea in the 1950s.

The Centers for Disease Control tested for hantavirus even though Asia and Europe were the only documented places hantavirus had been known to occur. No known cases had ever been reported in the United States. In addition, all the cases in Asia and Europe had involved hantaviruses that caused kidney failure, never respiratory failure. The testing revealed a previously unknown hantavirus which was eventually named Sin Nombre virus, Spanish for "No Name" virus. The disease became formally known as hantavirus cardiopulmonary syndrome (HCPS) or simply hantavirus pulmonary syndrome (HPS).

Several theories were advanced to explain the emergence of the new virus. These included increased contact between humans and mice due to a "bumper crop" in the deer mouse population. Another theory was that something within the virus had changed, allowing it to jump to humans. A third theory was that nothing had changed, that hantavirus cases had in fact occurred previously but had not been properly diagnosed. This last theory turned out to be the correct one when it was discovered that the first known case had actually occurred in a 38-year-old Utah man in 1959.

Like the Korean virus, Sin Nombre virus does not spread person-to-person. Instead, transmission occurs when humans are exposed to air contaminated with aerosolized mouse feces, usually within enclosed spaces. All of the Four Corners victims were found to have significant infestations of deer mice in and around their homes.

Course of illness and death rate

Doctors reported that all of the Four Corners patients had mild flu-like symptoms such as malaise, headache, cough, and fever, with a sudden onset of pulmonary edema necessitating ventilators before eventually causing death. From April to May 1993, there were 24 reported cases in the region. Twelve of those people died, resulting in a 50% mortality rate. Of the 24 patients, 14 were Native Americans, nine were non-Hispanic whites and one was Hispanic.

Early cases in Navajo tradition

Navajo leaders reported that similar outbreaks had occurred in 1918, 1933, and 1934. Navajo ethnological stories have identified mice as sources of bad luck and illness since the 19th century.

In popular culture
The outbreak was covered in the Forensic Files episode "With Every Breath."

See also

 Sin Nombre virus

References

External links
 Sloan Science and Film / Short Films / Muerto Canyon by Jen Peel, 29 minutes
 CDC's Hantavirus Technical Information Index page
 Viralzone: Hantavirus
 Virus Pathogen Database and Analysis Resource (ViPR): Hantaviridae
 Occurrences and deaths in North and South America

1993 disease outbreaks
1993 disasters in the United States
Rodent-carried diseases
Hantavirus infections
Disease outbreaks in the United States
History of the Southwestern United States